The 2004 World Field Archery Championships were held in Plitvice Lakes National Park, Croatia.

Medal summary (Men's individual)

Medal summary (Women's individual)

Medal summary (Men's Team)

Medal summary (Women's Team)

Medal summary (Men's Juniors)

Medal summary (Women's Juniors)

Medal summary (Junior Men's Team)

References

E
2004 in Croatian sport
International archery competitions hosted by Croatia
World Field Archery Championships